LaSalle Community Comprehensive High School (commonly referred to as LCCHS or LaSalle Comprehensive) is a secondary school in the Montreal, Quebec, Canada borough of LaSalle. It is part of the Lester B. Pearson School Board. The present school is the result of a merger between two former schools, Leroux High School and LaSalle Catholic High School, which occurred in 1971.

References

External links 
 
 Info page from Lester B. Pearson School Board

High schools in Montreal
LaSalle, Quebec
Lester B. Pearson School Board